Kouandé is a town, arrondissement and commune, located in the Atakora Department of Benin.The commune covers an area of 4500 square kilometres and as of 2013 had a population of 112,014 people. The main town had an estimated 7,127 people in 2008.

References

Communes of Benin
Populated places in the Atakora Department
Arrondissements of Benin